Bezmer, Dobrich Province is a village in Tervel Municipality, Dobrich Province, northeastern Bulgaria.

References

Villages in Dobrich Province